"Champion" is a song by Canadian rapper Nav, featuring American rapper and singer Travis Scott. It was sent to rhythmic contemporary radio on June 26, 2018, as the third and final single from the former's debut studio album, Reckless.

Music video 
The music video was released on August 9, 2018. Filmed in Hawaii, it features cameos from rappers Gunna, Sheck Wes and Don Toliver.

Charts

Certifications

References 

2018 songs
2018 singles
Republic Records singles
Nav (rapper) songs
Songs written by Nav (rapper)
Travis Scott songs
Songs written by Travis Scott
Songs written by Amir Esmailian
Songs written by Oz (record producer)